The Journal of Experimental Psychology: Animal Learning and Cognition is a peer-reviewed academic journal published by the American Psychological Association. It covers research in experimental psychology, specifically pertaining to all aspects of animal behavior processes. It was established in 1975 as the Journal of Experimental Psychology: Animal Behavior Processes (J. Exp. Psychol. Anim. Behav. Process.), an independent section of the Journal of Experimental Psychology. In 2014, the journal subtitle was changed to Animal Learning and Cognition. The editor-in-chief is Ralph R. Miller (Binghamton University).

The journal has implemented the Transparency and Openness Promotion (TOP) Guidelines.  The TOP Guidelines provide structure to research planning and reporting and aim to make research more transparent, accessible, and reproducible.

Abstracting and indexing 
The journal is abstracted and indexed by MEDLINE/PubMed and the Social Sciences Citation Index. According to the Journal Citation Reports, the journal has a 2020 impact factor of 2.478.

References

External links 
 

American Psychological Association academic journals
English-language journals
Quarterly journals
Publications established in 1975
Experimental psychology journals